Michael Raab (born December 28, 1982) is a male butterfly swimmer from the United States, who won the gold medal in the men's 200m butterfly event at the 2003 Pan American Games. Born in Washington, D.C. he broke the 200m fly meet record at that tournament.

References
 Profile

1982 births
Living people
American male swimmers
People from Washington, D.C.
Swimmers at the 2003 Pan American Games
Pan American Games gold medalists for the United States
Pan American Games medalists in swimming
Medalists at the 2003 Pan American Games